Islesboro Central School (ICS) is a public K-12 school located in Islesboro, Maine, United States. It is the only school on the island.

History
In 2010, Islesboro Central School underwent an 8 million dollar renovation.  The students in grades 5-12 attended school in portables amid the construction.  The students in grades k-4 attended school in the local Islesboro Community Center.

Academics

Islesboro Central School has a magnet school program, which attracts off-island students to the school. The school also offers a number of Advanced Placement classes. Alumni of Islesboro Central School have matriculated at schools like Bowdoin College, Colby College, Harvard University, Middlebury College, United States Coast Guard Academy, United States Military Academy and the University of Maine.

Athletics

Islesboro Central School offers five varsity sports to its students:

 Basketball
 Soccer
 Cross-country
 Sailing
 Track and Field

References

External links
Official site
Great Schools Profile

Schools in Waldo County, Maine
Public high schools in Maine
Public elementary schools in Maine
Public middle schools in Maine
Educational institutions established in 1952
Magnet schools in Maine
1952 establishments in Maine
Public K-12 schools in the United States